Robotman (Robert Crane) is a Golden Age DC Comics superhero. He first appeared in Star Spangled Comics #7 (April 1942) and was created by Jerry Siegel and Leo Nowak. As his name suggests, Robotman is a cyborg; part robot and part human.

Fictional character biography
Robert Crane is a scientist whose brain was placed inside a robotic body after he had been fatally shot by a criminal named Mason. Since Crane had to be legally dead for his assailants to be charged with murder, he created a civilian identity as Paul Dennis, accomplished with lifelike face mask and gloves. As Robotman, he was a member of the World War II-era team, the All-Star Squadron. He also fought crime solo with help from his canine sidekick, Robbie the Robot Dog. His stories were mostly lighthearted in nature, featuring whimsical situations and plenty of comedy relief (usually provided by Robbie). Still, the story remained grounded in Robotman's struggle to adjust to his new existence, at one point having to reveal his real identity in court, and being declared legally human.

In 1951, Crane helped Charles McNider, the original Doctor Mid-Nite, make the devices McNider needed to become Starman. McNider used the devices in that guise for a half a year and then gave them to David Knight, a Starman from the future who used them for the rest of the year before returning to the future and dying there.

Robotman was revealed to have been one of several other heroes involved in the first meeting of the charter members of the Justice League of America prior to the official forming of the team, an event which was suppressed from the public record.

Robotman's career came to an end by unique means. His former lab assistant Charles Grayson discovered that he was dying of a brain disease which left the rest of his tissues unharmed. He therefore bequeathed his body to Robotman to give him the possibility of a new life. Robotman had been trapped in suspended animation after being caught in a rockslide. His mechanical body shut down to preserve his brain, and it took twenty years for enough power to build up for him to reactivate and free himself. A power surge revived him, and after adjusting to being twenty years in the future, he learned what Grayson had done for him and gladly regained the humanity he'd thought lost forever.

No longer a cyborg, he resurfaced in the first issues of Stars and S.T.R.I.P.E. and lent Pat Dugan some components of his own disassembled robotic body in order to perfect the S.T.R.I.P.E. suit of armor.

In 2011, "The New 52" rebooted the DC universe. In this continuity, Robert Crane was a World War II Allied Forces scientist who was captured by the Japanese army and he was kept alive to create a robot named J.A.K.E. (an anagram for Japanese Attack Killer Elite) for the Japanese army to use. When Crane was rescued by the Allied Forces led by the Bride of Frankenstein, Crane revealed that he programmed J.A.K.E. to work for the Allied Forces as G.I. Robot following its brief fight with Frankenstein.

In 2016, DC Comics implemented another relaunch of its books called "DC Rebirth" which restored its continuity to a form much as it was prior to "The New 52". Robotman under his alias of Paul Dennis was seen at Robocon 2020 which was attended by Metal Men members Tin and Lead and Ilda from the show "Star Hawkins, Space Detective". The group gets attacked by brainwashed people in robotic armor where they managed to dismantle Robotman. The conflict is then crashed by OMAC.

Powers and abilities
Robert Crane possesses Genius-level intellect.

As Robotman, he possesses superhuman strength, stamina, durability, speed, agility, and senses. He can also unleash thermal blasts from his fingers and possesses extendable limbs.

Equipment
Robotman possesses a jet pack that enables him to fly.

Enemies
Robotman's "rogues gallery" includes:

 "Slick" Sharp - A criminal lawyer.
 Baffler
 Blaster - A saboteur working for a foreign agent.
 Dr. Gaunt - A mad genius.
 Dr. Ripari (aka Dr. Ripper)
 Eye - Dr. Benton is a hospital doctor and crime syndicate leader who has a luminiscent painting of an eye on the back of his jacket.
 Human Magnet - A criminal who created a magnetic device that he wore on his torso.
 Mason - A criminal responsible for shooting Robert Crane which led to his transformation into Robotman.
 Murder Master - Carl Denton is a criminal who was previously sent to prison by Paul Dennis for trying to steal his research.
 An evil version of Robotman
 "Slanteyes" - A Japanese agent.
 Tiger-Man - A costumed cat burglar.
 Wizard - Vince Watson is a criminal inventor.

Other versions

Elseworlds
In the Elseworlds series The Golden Age, Robotman figures prominently as a troubled hero and later villain. The series depicts that after World War II  Robotman purposefully ignores his humanity, developing an inhuman mental state, focusing on being a robot. He is depicted stopping a robbery with deadly force, and later being approached by Tex Thompson (Mr. America), the current form of the Ultra-Humanite. It is unsaid what the Ultra-Humanite promises or uses to recruit Robotman, but Robotman becomes his unquestioning servant, committing murder, and often staying close to Thompson during his political appearances. Thompson even berates him without any objections from Robotman. Publicly, Robotman is hailed as one of the few heroes to go public and serve with Thompson. In the final battle Robotman brutally kills Miss America before she reveals Thompson is the Ultra-Humanite. An enraged Hourman rips off one of Robotman's arms and finishes Miss America's public accusation. While the other heroes face Dynaman, a transformed Dan the Dyna-Mite, Paula Brooks (a reformed villain, the Tigress) and Lance Gallant (Captain Triumph), who had become lovers over the course of the story, confront and defeat Robotman. During their fight Robotman states he always knew the Ultra-Humanite was in Tex Thompson's body and that he does not care. In the end, Gallant, refusing to transform into Captain Triumph, shoves one of the Tigress' wooden crossbow bolts further into Robotman's head. This causes Robotman to explode and fatally electrocutes Gallant, much to the Tigress' and Gallant's deceased brother's sorrow.

Flashpoint
In the alternate timeline of the Flashpoint event, Robert Crane is a human scientist, never becoming a Robotman in World War II. Recently Robert's government services are shutting the Project M down of Frankenstein and the Creature Commandos. In the modern era, Robert Crane is still alive and now a doctor, and he helps the government revive G.I. Robot to join the soldiers to eliminate Frankenstein and the Creatures of the Unknown after they escape from the lab facility.

Earth 2
In 2011, "The New 52" rebooted the DC universe. On Earth 2, Robert Crane is a scientist working for the World Army. He was among the scientists working on the Red Tornado project. When a clone of Superman was revealed to be one of the Hunger Dogs, Crane was assisted by Sam Lane in uploading Lois Lane's memories into the Red Tornado. When the Superman clone's fight with Doctor Fate caused as cave-in at the Arkham Base, Crane was caught in the cave-in. He survived where Terry Sloane placed his brain in a robot body.

References

Cyborg superheroes
DC Comics American superheroes
DC Comics characters who can move at superhuman speeds
DC Comics characters with superhuman senses
DC Comics characters with superhuman strength
DC Comics cyborgs
DC Comics robots
DC Comics scientists
Characters created by Jerry Siegel
Comics characters introduced in 1942
Fictional characters who can stretch themselves
Fictional characters with superhuman durability or invulnerability
Fictional roboticists
Golden Age superheroes
Robot superheroes